The March 83C is a highly successful and extremely competitive open-wheel race car, designed by and built by March Engineering, to compete in the 1983 IndyCar season. The season was a white-wash and a clean-sweep for March, winning 7 out of the 13 races, and taking 9 pole positions that season. Newey's March 84C chassis successfully clinched the 1983 Constructors' Championship, and the 1983 Indianapolis 500 with Tom Sneva. It was powered by the Ford-Cosworth DFX turbo V8 engine.

References

External links 

Racing cars
March vehicles
American Championship racing cars